Threads is a Norwegian-Canadian animated short film, directed by Torill Kove and released in 2017. Based on Kove's own experience as an adoptive parent, the film depicts a woman who catches a thread in the sky which carries her to a baby girl, whom she rears and remains connected to with a red thread of love and emotional connection until the girl is a young woman old enough to go seek her own thread of connection to a baby of her own.

In advance of the film's release, Kove spoke about her creative process in an interview on the National Film Board of Canada's organizational blog: 

The film premiered at the Norwegian Short Film Festival in June 2017, and had its Canadian premiere at the 2017 Toronto International Film Festival. In December 2017, the film was named to TIFF's annual year-end Canada's Top Ten list for short films.

In 2018, Kove also published the story as a children's book.

References

External links

2017 short films
Canadian animated short films
Norwegian animated short films
Animated films without speech
Films directed by Torill Kove
National Film Board of Canada animated short films
2010s Canadian films